Wada Bari Tarzan Mathisabayata, also as Wada Bari Tarzan 2, is a 2008 Sri Lankan Sinhala comedy film co-directed by Sudesh Wasantha Peiris and Sunil Soma Peiris and produced by Sunil T. Fernando for Sunil T. Films. The film is the sequel to blockbuster 2007 movie Weda Beri Tarzan. Tennyson Cooray and Piyumi Purasinghe reprised their role in first film in lead roles along with Chathura Perera, Janesh Silva and Jeevan Handunnetti. Music composed by Keshan Perera. It is the 1105th Sri Lankan film in the Sinhala cinema.

Plot

Cast
 Tennyson Cooray as Tarzan 'Ta' / Mason
 Piyumi Purasinghe as Maheshi
 Chathura Perera as Perera
 Janesh Silva as Cowboy
 Jeevan Handunnetti as Nanna
 Susila Kottage as Susila
 D.B. Gangodathenna as Gunda 'Daddy'
 Prasanna Fonseka as Nayakathuma
 Ananda Wickramage as Rival 
 Dayaratne Siriwardena as Kiri Honda

Sequel
The sequel of the film, Nathi Bari Tarzan was released on 22 February 2019.

References

2008 films
2000s Sinhala-language films
2008 comedy films
Sri Lankan comedy films